The 2012 Spa-Francorchamps GP2 Series round was a GP2 Series motor race held on September 1 and 2, 2012 at Circuit de Spa-Francorchamps, Belgium. It was the tenth round of the 2012 GP2 Series. The race supported the 2012 Belgian Grand Prix.

Classification

Qualifying

Feature race

Sprint race

Standings after the round 

 Drivers' Championship standings

 Teams' Championship standings

 Note: Only the top five positions are included for both sets of standings.

See also 
 2012 Belgian Grand Prix
 2012 Spa-Francorchamps GP3 Series round

References 

Spa-Francorchamps
GP2